Sir Edward Walpole KB (1621 – 18 March 1668) was an English  politician and knight who sat in the House of Commons from 1660 to 1668.

Walpole was the son of Robert Walpole of Houghton and his wife Susan Barkham, daughter of Sir Edward Barkham of South Acre who had been Lord Mayor of London. He was baptised on 9 November 1621. He was a student of Middle Temple in 1640. In 1657 he was commissioner for assessment for Norfolk and was commissioner for  sewers in 1658 and  1659. He was commissioner for  militia in March 1660 and lieutenant colonel  of foot militia from April 1660 to his death.
  
In 1660, Walpole was elected Member of Parliament for King's Lynn in the Convention Parliament. He was a JP from June 1660 and Deputy Lieutenant and commissioner for assessment for Norfolk from August 1660 until his death. He was commissioner for  sewers again in  September 1660. In 1661 he was re-elected MP for King's Lynn in the Cavalier Parliament. He was created Knight of the Bath on 19 April 1661. From 1662 to 1663 he was commissioner for corporations. He succeeded his father in 1663. In 1668 he was commissioner for trade with Scotland.

Walpole died at the age of about 46 and was buried at Houghton, Norfolk.

Walpole married Susan Crane, daughter of Sir Robert Crane, 1st Baronet  of Chilton, Suffolk in around 1649. They had five sons and eight daughters. She died on  7 July 1667.

One of his sons was Robert Walpole, whose son was Robert Walpole, Britain's longest-serving Prime Minister. Another son was Horatio Walpole.

References

External links
 	Engraved portrait  by Andrew Birrell (engraver and publisher circa 1770–circa 1820); Silvester Harding (1745–1809) held by University of Leicester

1621 births
1668 deaths
17th-century English people
Commissioners for sewers
Deputy Lieutenants of Norfolk
English MPs 1660
English MPs 1661–1679
Knights of the Bath
People from Houghton, Norfolk
Robert Walpole
Edward
English justices of the peace